The 2019–20 season is Defensa y Justicia's 7th consecutive season in the top division of Argentine football. In addition to the Primera División, the club are competing in the Copa Argentina, Copa de la Superliga and Copa Libertadores.

The season generally covers the period from 1 July 2019 to 30 June 2020.

Review

Pre-season
Before welcoming any new faces, Defensa y Justicia said goodbye to three players in the early months. Lisandro Martínez's transfer to Eredivisie side Ajax was announced on 20 May 2019, while Leonel Miranda switched Argentina for Mexico by signing for Tijuana and Ciro Rius left across the Primera División to Rosario Central in early June. José Luis Fernández was their next departure, as he joined Atlético Tucumán on 17 June. Jonás Gutiérrez departed to Banfield on 19 June. Three incomings came on 24 June, with Marcelo Herrera, Gonzalo Piovi and Juan Rodríguez moving from Belgrano, Racing Club and Fénix - while Daniel González went to Dorados de Sinaloa. Héctor Martínez, from River Plate, was loaned on 27 June. A day after, Rafael Barrios left for San Martín.

Defensa y Justicia defeated Defensores de Belgrano 2–0 on 29 June in a pre-season friendly, with the goals coming from Alexis Castro and Nicolás Fernández. They met in a second match straight after, with Héctor Martínez scoring his first goal in a 1–0 win. A number of players who were out on loan in 2018–19 officially returned to Defensa on 30 June 2019, with the ones loaned in doing likewise. Maximiliano Caire was signed by Gimnasia y Esgrima on 1 July, on the same day as Guido Mainero completed a loan move in from Vélez Sarsfield. Hours later, Nicolás Maná was snapped up; having spent the prior months unattached after leaving Greek team Panetolikos. Defensa captured Enzo Coacci from Olimpo on 2 July. Fernando Barrientos went back to Lanús soon after.

Hugo Silva moved to Estudiantes (BA) of Primera B Nacional on 1 July. Defensa remained unbeaten in pre-season on 3 July, after beating and drawing with Huracán at the Estadio Norberto "Tito" Tomaghello. Diego Mat. Rodríguez went to promoted Central Córdoba on 5 July, as Leonardo Villalba did on 12 July. Fernando Pellegrino rejoined Huracán on loan on 5 July, having returned from the same transaction on 30 June. Defensa drew back-to-back with Chacarita Juniors in friendlies on 6 July. Paraguayan youngster Braian Ojeda was loaned from Olimpia on 12 July. Newell's Old Boys were fought in exhibition matches on 13 July, with Defensa coming away without goals or a victory; drawing and losing games at the Predio Áreas Grandes in Florencio Varela.

Talleres, of Remedios de Escalada, clinched the loan signing of Matías Sosa on 17 July. Gonzalo Arrieta departed to Flandria on 19 July. Defensa revealed their squad numbers for 2019–20 on 19 July.

July
Marcelo Herrera scored in Defensa y Justicia's opening competitive fixture of 2019–20, as he netted to take a Copa Argentina encounter with Gimnasia y Esgrima to penalties; which Defensa won, though Herrera was sent off early in the second half. Raúl Loaiza, who was on loan to San Lorenzo last season, joined Defensa permanently from Atlético Nacional on 25 July. After the arrival of Ojeda, a second Paraguayan in Aldo Maiz entered the ranks from General Díaz on 27 July. Defensa suffered a loss to Independiente on the opening day in the league on 28 July.

August
On 1 August, Neri Cardozo was signed by Mariano Soso from Racing Club. Soon after, Juan Martín Lucero and Diego Mar. Rodríguez agreed contracts with Defensa from Liga MX's Tijuana. That date also saw Lucas Villarruel leave for Newell's Old Boys. Defensa made it two defeats from two Primera División fixtures on 4 August, losing on the road against Unión Santa Fe. Defensa's poor start to the competitive season continued on 18 August, as Arsenal de Sarandí scored three unanswered goals in the league at the Estadio Norberto "Tito" Tomaghello. Defensa met fellow winless club Gimnasia y Esgrima on 24 August, with Defensa coming away with their first victory after Rafael Delgado's strike in the second half. Defensa's first draw came on 30 August - versus Banfield.

Squad

Transfers
Domestic transfer windows:3 July 2019 to 24 September 201920 January 2020 to 19 February 2020.

Transfers in

Transfers out

Loans in

Loans out

Friendlies

Pre-season
Defensa y Justicia's first opponent of pre-season was revealed on 20 June, as Primera B Nacional side Chacarita Juniors scheduled an exhibition match with them for 6 July. A five-match announcement, including games versus Defensores de Belgrano and Temperley, was made by the club on 27 June; though the Temperley meeting was later cancelled.

Mid-season
A friendly was announced, on 24 June, with newly-promoted tier two team Atlanta. A third encounter versus Atlético Tucumán was also set. Aldosivi revealed an exhibition match with them on 4 September.

Competitions

Primera División

League table

Relegation table

Source: AFA

Results summary

Matches
The fixtures for the 2019–20 campaign were released on 10 July.

Copa Argentina

La Plata's Gimnasia y Esgrima were drawn to face Defensa y Justicia in the Copa Argentina, at the neutral venue of the Estadio Alfredo Beranger in Turdera; all matches in the competition are played neutrally.

Copa de la Superliga

Copa Libertadores

Squad statistics

Appearances and goals

Statistics accurate as of 31 August 2019.

Goalscorers

Notes

References

Defensa y Justicia seasons
Defensa y Justicia